Kaspars Liepiņš (born 11 October 1984 in Cēsis) is a Latvian sidecarcross rider and the 2009 World Champion, won as the passenger of the Belgian Joris Hendrickx.

As Hendrickx's passenger he is also a three-time Belgian national sidecarcross champion, having won titles in 2008, 2009 and 2010, and the 2013 French and 2015 German champion.

Sidecarcross results
Kaspars Liepiņš took part in sidecarcross races in the national Latvian championship from 2003, at first as passenger for U. Zvaigznītis, and, from 2004, on the side of Kārlis Leimanis.

Kaspars Liepiņš made his world championship debut on 9 April 2007, in the first race of the season, alongside fellow Latvian Kārlis Leimanis. In their first race, they finished only 26th but managed to win three points in race two of the event, the Dutch GP at Oldebroek. The duo took part in the first four of eight events that season, with a sixteenth place their best result and an overall finish of 33rd.

The following season, Liepiņš teamed up with Joris Hendrickx and earned considerably more success, coming fourth overall and winning the Belgian national championship.

The 2009 season was initially dominated by Daniël Willemsen, who had won the previous six world championships. When Willemsen missed a number of races because of injury, Jan Hendrickx took the lead in the competition. At the German GP at Strassbessenbach, Hendrickx/Liepiņš took out their first race win and also their first Grand Prix victory. With one event, the GP at Rudersberg, to go, Joris Hendrickx and Kaspars Liepins were 13 points behind the leaders Jan Hendrickx / Tim Smeuninx, in second place, but the leading combination suffered an engine defect in round four of the first race in Germany and lost all its advantage. A win and a second place in the last event earned the Belgian / Latvian combination the world title, with Joris Hendrickx becoming only the second Belgian to do so, after Sven Verbrugge, and the first Belgian driver to record this achievement. Kaspars Liepiņš, in turn, is the fourth Latvian with world championship honours in the sport.

The Belgian-Latvian combination Hendrickx-Liepiņš suffered a season-ending injury at the qualifying of the German Grand Prix in July 2011, being able to compete in the race but requiring surgery afterwards. Consequently, the team only finished ninth in the overall standings at the end of the season.

The team was able to complete the 2012 season without injury and finished fourth in the world championship, 83 points behind Daniël Willemsen who won his tenth title. In November 2012, Joris Hendrickx retired from the sport, initially leaving Liepiņš to look for a new team. Despite his announced retirement, Hendrickx still took part in non-GP sidecarcross races together with Liepiņš, the pair winning the event in Muri, Switzerland in 2013. Hendrickx  also declared that he would start at the Belgian and French GP's in 2013, but did not compete in either event. Instead, Hendrickx and Liepiņš raced the French national championship which they won.

In the 2014 season he competed in only a few selected races of the French championship, still as passenger of Hendrickx, but still as a top contender. The following season the pair won the German championship.

Season by season
Kaspars Liepiņš sidecarcross world championship statistics:

Source:
 Passengers in italics.

Honours

World Championship
 Champions: (1) 2009
 Runners-up: (1) 2010

Belgium
 Champions: (3) 2008, 2009, 2010

France
 Champions: (1) 2013

Germany
 Champions: (1) 2015

References

External links
 Official website
 Blakusvāģi: Kaspars Liepiņš - pasaules čempions Article on the championship-winning race in 2009 
 The World Championship on Sidecarcross.com
 The John Davey Grand Prix Pages - Results of all GP's up until 2005

1984 births
Living people
Latvian sidecarcross riders
People from Cēsis